Senator Cabaniss may refer to:

Thomas Banks Cabaniss (1835–1915), Georgia State Senate
William J. Cabaniss (born 1938), Alabama State Senate